Saban Entertainment, Inc. (along with Saban International; currently operating under the legal name, BVS Entertainment, Inc.) was a worldwide-served independent US-Israeli television production company formed in 1980 by Haim Saban and Shuki Levy, which was originally founded as a music production company under the name, Saban Productions. The first TV show produced by Saban is the live action/animated show Kidd Video.

The company imported, dubbed, and adapted various Japanese series such as Maple Town, Noozles, Funky Fables, Samurai Pizza Cats, and the first three Digimon series to North American and international markets over syndication, including both animation and live-action shows. Saban also adapted various tokusatsu shows from Toei Company, including Power Rangers (based on the Super Sentai series), Big Bad Beetleborgs (based on Juukou B-Fighter), VR Troopers (featuring elements of Metal Hero series such as Space Sheriff Shaider, Jikuu Senshi Spielban, and Choujinki Metalder), and Masked Rider (an original interpretation using scenes from the Japanese Kamen Rider Black RX).

Saban was involved in the co-production of French/US animated shows created by Jean Chalopin for DIC Entertainment. Some of these early 1980s co-productions were Camp Candy, Ulysses 31, Jayce and the Wheeled Warriors, and The Mysterious Cities of Gold (the third of which was a Japanese co-production).

Saban has also distributed and provided music for television programs produced by other companies such as The Super Mario Bros. Super Show!, Inspector Gadget and the first two dubbed seasons of Dragon Ball Z.

In the 1990s, Saban also operated a production company Libra Pictures, which was targeted to older audiences than it was on Saban's normal kid-friendly output, as well as a syndicated subsidiary Saban Domestic Distribution, whose primarily purpose was to distribute shows for first-run and off-net syndication.

History

The early years 
Saban Entertainment was formed in 1980 as Saban Productions, Inc., which was initially a music production company. The first Saban logo depicted a Saturn-like planet with "Saban," in a Pac-Man style font, going across the planet's ring. Many years later, the company created a division (Saban International N.V.) based in both the U.S. and the Netherlands for the international distribution of its shows (not to be confused with the interchangeable "Saban International Paris" as they were two different entities). In 1983, it formed a longtime relationship with DIC Enterprises, to create soundtracks for the programs, and also soundtrack outsourcing to different companies like Ruby-Spears Enterprises and Filmation.

In 1984, Saban moved into production outright with its first ever television program Kidd Video, which was in co-production with DIC Enterprises, and it was picked up by NBC as part of the 1984-85 Saturday morning children's programming block. The next project produced by Saban themselves is Macron 1, a compilation of various unrelated Japanese anime shows, and relies on pop music, which was picked up for syndication by Orbis Communications for the fall of 1986.

In 1986, Saban Productions bought the foreign rights to the DIC Enterprises library of children's programming from DIC's parent DIC Animation City and then sold the rights to Jean Chalopin's C&D. DIC then sued Saban for damages and in 1991, DIC and Saban reached a settlement. In 1987, DiC expanded its relationship with Saban Productions to co-produce its series, a relationship that eventually lasted until it was hit by a lawsuit in 1990. That year, both DIC and Saban Productions teamed up with NBC to provide series commitments to I'm Telling! and The New Archies, which was committed to 26 and 13 segments, respectively.

On June 10, 1987, Saban Productions, who was the largest suppliers for music and TV, and producer of four Saturday morning animated series, is expanding to live-action TV and theatrical features, and the company has its boards on a made-for-television feature for the NBC television network, a late-night hour series for CBS, a first-run strip for syndication and a theatrical feature film, and the company is freefalling some of its projects, and had a pilot Love on Trial, for the Fall 1988 strip, which doesn't have a distributor for the property yet, but this means Saban is marketing the first-run strip, making use of some of the selling techniques applied to the marketing of kid-vid in syndication, as well as completely financing Hidden Rage, and putting up a modest $1.5 million for film, which Saban promised it was going to look like TV's $6 million, because the founder doesn't have the studio overhead and built-in excess, and teaming up with Ron Ziskin and his Four Point Entertainment on a late-night hour program Shocking But True, for CBS, to appeal fans of the young audience, but all the projects were never realized.

In late October 1987, Saban Productions had obtained three independently produced projects as part of the real first slate for the NATPE conference, and the first strips would be Love Court, in collaboration with television syndicator Orbis Communications, and the other strip would be the first game show which was set to be on Six Flags, All-American Family Challenge, which gave us a $20 million set that they work and didn't have to build, and the third pilot strip aimed at youths were Alphy's Hollywood Power Party, which will be a teen celebrity dance show, and the fourth project was a network game show version of the board game Uno, which was set for NBC, and was to be produced by Peter Berlin and Rob Fiedler, who joined Saban shortly after Wordplay was cancelled.

In 1988, Saban Productions and Washington-based newspaper columnist Jack Anderson will offer four quarterly specials under the branding American Expose, with then-future Cops creator/producer John Langley and Malcolm Barbour serving as producers. It is revealed that Orbis Communications, who already syndicated Saban's Macron 1 was signed on to distribute the programs. Newly created Saban International N.V, was to handle distribution of the same programs, as well as signing up for distribution of non-Saban television material. It is reported that Saban International N.V. would handle international sales of DiC programs such as Hey Vern, It's Ernest, until a lawsuit hit in 1990.

In early 1989, the company renamed itself Saban Entertainment, Inc. As the company grew, additional executives were hired to push into new areas like prime time programming. Saban hired Stan Golden from Horizon International TV to head their Saban international distribution arm. Then in August 1989, Tom Palmieri came from MTM Enterprises to become Saban president.

By January 2, 1990, Saban formed Saban/Scherick Productions division for production done with Edgar Scherick, primarily miniseries and made-for-TV films. Around this time, they also began distributing the film library of New World Pictures (which had been sold by New World to Trans-Atlantic Films, consisted of ex-New World employees) to television stations. CLT in Luxembourg had signed a deal with Saban to market TV shows.

In 1990, Saban entered into a partnership with video game publisher Acclaim Entertainment and syndicator Bohbot Entertainment to develop the program Video Power. Also that year, Saban started Saban Video, with distribution being handled by Video Treasures. In 1991, Saban Entertainment has struck a deal with home video deal Prism Entertainment in order that Prism would gave home video distribution rights and Saban International gaining international distribution rights. By the following year of 1992, Saban signed a domestic distribution deal with Bohbot Communications to handle Around the World in 80 Dreams for syndication.

Partnership with Marvel Entertainment Group and News Corporation 
In 1992, Saban partnered with the Marvel Entertainment Group to produce an animated series based on Marvel's comic-book heroes the X-Men. Saban obtained the rights in a joint partnership with PolyGram Filmed Entertainment and the Fox Children's Network, becoming Saban's first hit program and the company's first breakthrough, teaming up with another company. The series ran until 1997. On August 28, 1993, Saban brought another hit to the Fox Kids lineup, Mighty Morphin Power Rangers, an adaptation of the Japanese Super Sentai franchise. In 1994 alone, licensed Power Rangers merchandise made Saban over a billion dollars in profits. At distinct times in the 1980s, both Loesch and Saban had attempted adaptations of these shows, but had found themselves repeatedly rejected by other networks.

New World Animation (The Incredible Hulk), Saban (X-Men), and Marvel Films Animation (Spider-Man) each produced a Marvel series for television. Later on in 1992, Saban formed a syndication subsidiary, Saban Domestic Distribution. The $50 million development slate was unveiled, and David Goodman, formerly of Goodman Entertainment Group was served as senior vice president of the company. Later in 1994, Saban signed a deal with A*Vision Entertainment to distribute cassettes under the Saban Home Entertainment and Libra Home Entertainment banners.

In 1994, Saban Entertainment launched Libra Pictures in an effort to gear films for older audiences, while the Saban name was used for kid-friendly material, in a similar manner what The Walt Disney Studios and Touchstone Pictures would have to offer. Also later that year, Saban launched a partnership/joint venture with UPN to start the UPN Kids block. The block would eventually premiere on September 10, 1995, along with the first two shows Space Strikers and Teknoman. In 1995, the Saban Interactive unit is producing CD-ROM software based on the Power Rangers franchise.

On October 17, 1995, Lance Robbins was made then president of motion pictures and television at the studio, and he was formerly at the Libra Pictures division. On November 3, 1995, Saban Entertainment and the Fox Broadcasting Company entered into a partnership that the two companies would create children's programing channels and services, develop and distribute programing and build licensing and merchandising opportunities on a global basis, and helped to expand its programming immediately.

In July 1996, Fox Children's Network secured rights from Marvel Entertainment Group for Captain America, Daredevil and Silver Surfer and additional characters to be developed into four series and 52 episodes over seven years. Also in the same month, Saban formed a new division, Saban Enterprises International, to handle international licensing, merchandising and promotional activities under president Michael Welter.  Oliver Spiner, senior vice president of Saban International, took over operational duties previously handled by Welter. Eric S. Rollman was promoted from senior vice president production to executive vice president of Saban Animation.

Also in 1996, Fox Children's Network merged with Saban Entertainment to form Fox Kids Worldwide, which included the Marvel Productions and Marvel Films Animation library. Also that year, Saban debuted its first FCC-friendly series The Why Why Family. Shortly afterwards, Saban terminated its deal with WarnerVision, and decided that they would move itself to Twentieth Century Fox Home Entertainment. In 1998, its syndication unit Saban Domestic Distribution announced that they would refocus on develop movies for syndication outside of the Twentieth Century Fox and Saban stations.

Marvel was developing a Captain America animated series with Saban Entertainment for Fox Kids to premiere in Fall 1998. However, due to Marvel's bankruptcy, the series was canceled before the premiere. Both Marvel and Saban would become parts of The Walt Disney Company; Saban (renamed BVS Entertainment) in 2002 and Marvel by the end of 2009. Then in 2010, Haim Saban founded a new company, Saban Capital Group (SCG); they produced shows under the name Saban Brands, such as all Power Rangers seasons starting with Power Rangers Samurai and Glitter Force.

BVS Entertainment 
On July 23, 2001, it was announced that the group would be sold to The Walt Disney Company as part of the sale of Fox Family Worldwide/Fox Kids Worldwide (now ABC Family Worldwide) by Haim Saban and News Corporation, and on October 24, 2001, the sale was completed with Saban Entertainment, Inc. rebranding as BVS (Buena Vista Studios) Entertainment, Inc. The final official program and completely produced and distributed by both Saban Entertainment, Inc and Saban International N.V. Holland was Power Rangers Time Force, which ran between February 3–November 17, 2001 however, Power Rangers Wild Force was the final series created by Saban (Saban created the series and produced only pre-production, following the acquisition of Fox Family Worldwide, the show was copyrighted to Disney and was distributed by BVS, although the show was produced by MMPR Productions, the producer of the Power Rangers series during the Saban era from 1993 to 2001).

Fate of Subsidiaries
After the sale of the Saban library to The Walt Disney Company, the subsidiaries were also rebranded, with Saban International N.V. becoming BVS International N.V. and Saban International Services, Inc. becoming BVS International Services, Inc. They served very little other than to hold copyrights for existing Saban properties.

Saban International Paris was purchased out in a management buyout shortly after the purchase and became independent after Saban stepped down from the studio. The Walt Disney Company, however, would purchase a 49% minority stake in Saban International Paris, and the studio was rebranded as "SIP Animation" in October 2002, as the studio was not allowed to use the "Saban" brand after its split.

Saban's distribution branch was folded into Buena Vista Television on May 1, 2002.

Saban's European licensing subsidiary based in the United Kingdom – Saban Consumer Products Europe, which had been considered within Fox Kids Europe since the end of 2000, was renamed as "Active Licensing Europe" on April 13, 2003,  and eventually Jetix Consumer Products on May 4, 2004.

The portion of Saban that handled ADR production and post-production services for anime's English-language dubbing was renamed by ABC Family Worldwide as "Sensation Animation" on September 9, 2002; and remained as such so Disney could continue dubbing Digimon (the second half of Digimon Tamers and Digimon Frontier) episodes. Once production ended in July 2003, Sensation Animation was closed as the studio had fulfilled its purpose. Disney would later go on to dub the four remainder Digimon films, Revenge of Diaboromon (DA02), Battle of Adventurers (DT), Runaway Locomon (DT) and Island of the Lost Digimon (DF) in 2005 and the fifth TV season, Digimon Data Squad in 2007, but this time, the dubbing was handled by post-production studio Studiopolis. The majority of the past voice actors returned with a lack of some voice actors such as Joshua Seth.

Saban International Paris

Saban International Paris, later SIP Animation, was a television production company based in France that operated from 1977 until the year of 2009.

Saban International Paris was founded in France by Haim Saban and Jacqueline Tordjman in 1977 as a record company. In 1989, Saban International Paris moved into the animation field. The studio would go on to produce many animated series for Fox Kids Europe between the 1990s and 2000s. Saban departed the company in 2001 with the purchase of Fox Family Worldwide, which was followed by The Walt Disney Company taking a stake in the company and a name has been changed to SIP Animation on October 1, 2002. SIP continued to co-produce animated series with Jetix Europe (formerly known as "Fox Kids Europe") during the 2000s. SIP Animation was closed in 2009.

List of television series and films

Animated TV series 
Saban Entertainment
 Kidd Video (1984–1985) (co-production with DIC Enterprises)
 Lazer Tag Academy (1986–1987)
 My Favorite Fairy Tales (1986) (co-production with Academy and Studio Unicorn)
 ALF: The Animated Series (1987–1989) (co-production with DIC Enterprises for Alien Productions)
 The New Archies (1987) (co-production with DIC Enterprises)
 Kissyfur (1988) (season 2 only; co-production with DIC Enterprises for NBC Productions)
 ALF Tales (1988–1989) (co-production with DIC Enterprises for Alien Productions)
 The Karate Kid (1989) (co-production with DIC Enterprises for Columbia Pictures Television)
 Camp Candy (1989–1992) (seasons 1 and 2; co-produced with DIC Enterprises)
 Kid 'n Play (1990)
 Video Power (1990–1992)
 Bobby's World (1990-1998) (co-production with Alevy Productions, Film Roman, and Fox Children's Productions)
 Little Shop (1991)
 Eek! The Cat (1992-1997) (co-production with Savage Studios Ltd., Nelvana, Film Roman, and Fox Children's Productions)
 X-Men (1992–1997) (co-production with Graz Entertainment and Marvel Entertainment Group)
 Jin Jin and the Panda Patrol (1994)
 BattleTech: The Animated Series (1994) (co-production with Worldwide Sports and Entertainment)
 Creepy Crawlers (1994–1996) (co-production with Abrams/Gentile Entertainment)
 Tenko and the Guardians of the Magic (1995–1996)
 Little Mouse on the Prairie (1996)
 Bureau of Alien Detectors (1996)
 The Mouse and the Monster (1996–1997)
 Silver Surfer (1998) (co-production with Marvel Studios)
 Bad Dog (1998–1999) (co-production with CinéGroupe)
 Monster Farm (1998–1999)
 The Secret Files of the Spy Dogs (1998–1999)
 Mad Jack the Pirate (1998–1999)
 The Avengers: United They Stand (1999–2000) (co-production with Marvel Studios)
 The Kids from Room 402 (1999–2000) (co-production with CinéGroupe)
 Xyber 9: New Dawn (1999–2000)
 NASCAR Racers (1999–2001)
 Spider-Man Unlimited (1999–2001) (co-production with Marvel Studios)
 Action Man (2000–2002)
 Pigs Next Door (2000)
 What's with Andy? season 1 (2001–2002) (co-production with CinéGroupe)
 Titeuf season 1 (2001–2002)
 Barbapapa (co-production with RTL Television)
                               
   

     
                      
                      
  

Saban International Paris/Saban International Strasbourg

Foreign TV series 
Saban Entertainment dubbed and or distributed the following foreign TV series in English:
 Spartakus and the Sun Beneath the Sea (1986–1987)
 Macron 1 (1986–1987)
 Maple Town (1987)
 A Christmas Adventure (1987) (TV special; co-produced with DIC Entertainment)
 Grimm's Fairy Tale Classics (1988–1989)
 Noozles (1988)
 The Adventures of Tom Sawyer (1988)
 Tales of Little Women (1988–1989)
 The Hallo Spencer Show (1989)
 Ox Tales (1989)
 Wowser (1989)
 Maya the Bee (1989–1990)
 Bumpety Boo (1989)
 Peter Pan: The Animated Series (1990)
 Pinocchio: The Series (1990)
 Dragon Warrior (1990)
 The Littl' Bits (1990)
 Tic Tac Toons (1990–1992) (anthology series consists of The Wacky World of Tic & Tac and Eggzavier the Eggasaurus)
 Funky Fables/Sugar and Spice (1991)
 Three Little Ghosts (1990)
 Samurai Pizza Cats (1991)
 Bob in a Bottle (1992)
 Jungle Tales (1992)
 Rock 'n Cop (1992)
 Three Little Ghosts "Afraid of the Dark" (1992)
 Huckleberry Finn (1993)
 Shuke and Beita (1993)
 Button Nose (1994)
 Honeybee Hutch (1995–1996)
 Teknoman (1995–1996)
 Eagle Riders (1996–1997)
 Dragon Ball Z (1996–1998) (TV distributor and musical composer for the Funimation-Ocean Productions dub of the first two seasons)
 Super Pig (1997)
 Willow Town (1997)
 Bit the Cupid (1998)
 Digimon Adventure (1999–2000)
 Cybersix (1999–2000)
 Hello Kitty's Paradise (2000)
 Flint the Time Detective (2000)
 Dinozaurs (2000)
 Escaflowne (2000)
 Digimon Adventure 02 (2000–2001)
 Mon Colle Knights (2001–2002)
 Digimon Tamers (2001–2002)
 Transformers: Robots in Disguise (2001–2002)
 Shinzo (2002; produced in 2000-01)
 Hatsumei Boy Kanipan (unreleased; produced in 2000–01)
 Slayers (unaired edited version; produced in 2001)

Live-action TV series 
Saban Entertainment produced and or distributed the following live action TV series:
 Bio-Man (1986) (unaired pilot)
 I'm Telling! (1987–1988) (co-production with DIC Enterprises)
 2 Hip 4 TV (1988)
 Treasure Mall (1988)
 Offshore Television (1988–1989) (co-production with King World R&D Network)
 Couch Potatoes (1989)
 Video Power (1990–1992)
 Scorch (1992) (co-production with Allan Katz Productions and Honeyland Productions for Lorimar Television)
 Power Rangers series (1993–2002):
 Mighty Morphin Power Rangers (1993–1995)
 Mighty Morphin Alien Rangers (1996)
 Power Rangers Zeo (1996)
 Power Rangers Turbo (1997)
 Power Rangers in Space (1998)
 Power Rangers Lost Galaxy (1999)
 Power Rangers Lightspeed Rescue (2000)
 Power Rangers Time Force (2001)
 Power Rangers Wild Force (2002) (only pre-production)
 Mad Scientist Toon Club (1993–1994)
 VR Troopers (1994–1996)
 Sweet Valley High (1994–1997)
 Masked Rider (1995–1996)
 Big Bad Beetleborgs (1996–1998)
 Breaker High (1997–1998)
 Ninja Turtles: The Next Mutation (1997–1998)
 The All New Captain Kangaroo (1997–1998)
 Mystic Knights of Tir Na Nog (1998–1999)
 The New Addams Family (1998–1999)
 Los Luchadores (2001)

Live-action films 
 Alphy's Hollywood Power Party (1987; TV special)
 Rescue Me (1988)
 Who Murdered JFK? (1988; TV special) (co-production with Barbour/Langley Productions)
 Terrorism USA (1989; TV special) (co-production with Barbour/Langley Productions)
 The Phantom of the Opera (1990) (produced by Saban/Scherick Productions, Hexatel, Starcom, TF1, Reteitalia, and Beta Film)
 Spymaker: The Secret Life of Ian Fleming (1990) (produced by Saban/Scherick Productions for TNT)
 A Perfect Little Murder (1990) (co-production with MollyBen Productions for Gary Hoffman Productions)
 Blind Vision (1991)
 Till Death Us Do Part (1991) (produced by Saban/Scherick Productions)
 Prey of the Chameleon (1992)
 Round Trip to Heaven (1992)
 Black Ice (1992)
 Revenge on the Highway (1992)
 Nightmare in the Daylight (1992) (produced by Saban/Scherick Productions and Smith/Richmond Productions)
 Anything for Love (1993)
 In the Shadows, Someone's Watching (1993)
 Under Investigation (1993)
 Terminal Voyage (1994)
 Samurai Cowboy (1994)
 Shadow of Obsession (1994)
 Guns of Honor: Rebel Rousers (1994)
 Blindfold: Acts of Obsession (1994)
 Guns of Honor: Trigger Fast (1994)
 Mighty Morphin Power Rangers: The Movie (1995)
 Virtual Seduction (1995)
 Christmas Reunion (1995)
 Chimp Lips Theater (1997; two TV specials)
 Turbo: A Power Rangers Movie (1997)
 Casper: A Spirited Beginning (1997)
 The Christmas List (1997)
 Gotcha (1998)
 Circles (1998)
 National Lampoon's Men in White (1998)
 Casper Meets Wendy (1998)
 Rusty: A Dog's Tale (1998)
 Addams Family Reunion (1998)
 Earthquake in New York (1998)
 Richie Rich's Christmas Wish (1998)
 Like Father, Like Santa (1998)
 Men of Means (1999)
 Taken (1999)
 Michael Jordan: An American Hero (1999)
 Don't Look Behind You (1999)
 Heaven's Fire (1999)
 Au Pair (1999)
 Ice Angel (2000)
 Au Pair II (2001)
 Oh, Baby! (2001)
 Three Days (2001)

Animated films/specials 
 Barbie and the Rockers: Out of this World (1987) (co-production with DIC Entertainment and Mattel)
 Barbie and The Sensations: Rockin' Back to Earth (1987) (co-production with DIC Entertainment and Mattel)
 Dragon Ball Z: The Tree of Might (1997) (TV distributor and musical composer for the 1997 Funimation-Ocean Productions dub)
 Digimon: The Movie (2000)

Library content 
These programs were distributed by Saban Entertainment beginning in 1996, when they merged with Fox Children's Network to form Fox Kids Worldwide.
Marvel Productions/New World Animation
 The Marvel Super Heroes (1966)
 Iron Man
 The Sub-Mariner
 The Incredible Hulk
 Captain America
 The Mighty Thor
 Spider-Man (1967–1970)
 The New Fantastic Four (1978)
 Spider-Woman (1979)
 Spider-Man (1981)
 Spider-Man and His Amazing Friends (1981)
 The Incredible Hulk (1982)
 Dungeons & Dragons (1983–1985)
 Little Wizards (1987–1988)
 RoboCop: The Animated Series (1988)
 Dino-Riders (1988)
 Rude Dog and the Dweebs (1989)
 Attack of the Killer Tomatoes (1990–1991)
 Biker Mice from Mars (1993–1996)
 Spider-Man (1994)
 Iron Man (1994)
 Fantastic Four (1994)
 The Incredible Hulk (1996)

Fox Children's Productions
 Bobby's World (1990–1998) (distributed until 2004)
 Peter Pan and the Pirates (1990–1991)
 Piggsburg Pigs! (1990–1991)
 Zazoo U (1990–1991)
 Eek! The Cat / EEK!Stravaganza (1992–1997)
 The Terrible Thunderlizards (1993–1997)
 Klutter! (1995–1996)
 Count DeClues' Mystery Castle (1993; TV special)
 Grunt & Punt (1994–1995)
 Red Planet (1994)
 The Tick (1994–1996)
 Life with Louie (1994–1998)
 Goosebumps (1995–1998) (International distribution only)

Créativité & Développement
 Botts (1986–1987)
 Diplodos (1987–1988)
 Amilcar's Window (1987–1989)
 Sophie and Virginie (1990–1992)
 Heroes on Hot Wheels (1991–1992)
 The Twins of Destiny (1991–1992)
 Cupido (1991)
 The Adventures of T-Rex (1992–1993)
 Magic Trolls and the Troll Warriors (1992; TV special)
 The Bots Master (1993–1994)

DIC Audiovisuel / DIC Enterprises (pre-1990)

Media releases 
Most Saban Entertainment-owned media from the early 1990s made their way to VHS in most regions. However, from the late 1990s on, almost all Saban Entertainment-owned entities were only released as Australian and New Zealand Region 4 VHSes. And also, according to current North American rights holders, Walt Disney Studios Home Entertainment had (and still has) no plans to release these titles to DVD and Blu-ray, and as such, some of them instead aired on their sibling television channel, Disney XD and originally was on Toon Disney and ABC Family until the retirement of the Jetix branding in the U.S. In most European countries, Fox Kids Europe (later as "Jetix Europe") had a sister channel called Fox Kids Play (later as "Jetix Play") which aired various Saban Entertainment programs and shows owned by Fox Kids Europe/Jetix Europe. Some shows were also released on DVD and VHS by various independent distributors, such as Maximum Entertainment in the United Kingdom.
Many Marvel-related series distributed by Saban, adding some live-action films such as Richie Rich's Christmas Wish and Three Days are available on the Disney+ streaming service, while The Tick is available on Hulu.

On March 13, 2012, Shout! Factory announced a home video distribution deal with Saban Brands, which includes VR Troopers, the first two seasons of Big Bad Beetleborgs and Ninja Turtles: The Next Mutation. The first 17 seasons of Power Rangers have been licensed for DVD releases by Shout! Factory, which has released the first 17 seasons to DVD in Region 1. In Germany, they have released complete-season boxsets to every Power Rangers series, along with the English versions included up until season 6 due to problems with Disney.

In Australia, Digimon: Digital Monsters had added with seasons one and two was re-released by Madman Entertainment on August 17, 2011. In addition, the first five series was released on DVD in North America through New Video.

Saban's library 
In 1996, the company had a library of more than 3,700 half-hours of children's programming, making it one of the largest in the world. By the time they were sold to Disney in 2001, their library had increased to over 6,500 half-hours of children's programing.

The Fox Kids/Saban Entertainment library today is mostly owned by The Walt Disney Company, with a few exceptions:
 The Power Rangers franchise and other PR-related shows (VR Troopers, Masked Rider, Ninja Turtles: The Next Mutation, Big Bad Beetleborgs, and Mystic Knights of Tir Na Nog), which were purchased back by Haim Saban from Disney for $43 million on May 12, 2010. The Digimon franchise in the United States was also purchased back by Saban on September 25, 2012. These programs are now owned by Hasbro through eOne, which acquired the assets of Saban Brands in 2018 (except for Mighty Morphin Power Rangers: The Movie and Turbo: A Power Rangers Movie, which were acquired by Disney via 20th Century Studios on March 20, 2019), while Digimon, despite initially being included in the Hasbro deal, has since reverted to Toei Animation Inc. (except for Digimon: The Movie, which was also acquired by Disney via the 20th Century Studios deal).
 Pigs Next Door was a co-production with Fox Kids, EM.TV and Wavery B.V. Studio 100, which acquired EM.TV's children's library in 2008, owns the US digital rights and some international rights to the series (Europe, China, Australia, New Zealand and Quebec).
 Disney sold Bobby's World to the series' creator Howie Mandel in 2004. Currently, Splash Entertainment owns the distribution rights to the series under license from him.
 The international distribution rights to the pre-1990 DIC Enterprises library reverted to DIC in the 2000s. This library is currently owned by the Canadian WildBrain through Cookie Jar Entertainment.
 Goosebumps is owned by Scholastic Entertainment, with distribution handled by 9 Story Media Group.
 Many of Saban's anime licenses, such as Eagle Riders, Macron 1, Noozles, Flint the Time Detective, The Littl' Bits and Saban's Adventures of Pinocchio, expired in the 2000s.
 CinéGroupe owns the series that it co-produced with Saban and SIP, including What's with Andy? and The Kids from Room 402. These series are distributed through partner company HG Distribution.

References 

 
1980 establishments in California
2002 disestablishments in California
American companies established in 1980
American companies disestablished in 2002
Anime companies
Companies based in Los Angeles
Fox Kids
Mass media companies established in 1980
Mass media companies disestablished in 2002
Former News Corporation subsidiaries
Disney acquisitions
Television production companies of the United States
2001 mergers and acquisitions